Practices in language education vary significantly by region. Firstly, the languages being learned differ; in the United States, Spanish is the most popular language to be learned, whereas the most popular languages to be learned in Australia are German, French, Italian and Mandarin Chinese. Also, teaching methods tend to differ by region. Language immersion is popular in some European countries, but is not used very much in the United States.

Europe

Foreign language education
1995 European Commission’s White Paper "Teaching and learning – Towards the learning society", stated that "upon completing initial training, everyone should be proficient in two Community foreign languages". The Lisbon Summit of 2000 defined languages as one of the five key skills.

In fact, even in 1974, at least one foreign language was compulsory in all but two European member states: Ireland and the United Kingdom (apart from Scotland). By 1998 nearly all pupils in Europe studied at least one foreign language as part of their compulsory education, the only exception being the Republic of Ireland, where primary and secondary schoolchildren learn both Irish and English, but neither is considered a foreign language although a third European language is also taught. Pupils in upper secondary education learn at least two foreign languages in Belgium, France, Denmark, Netherlands, Luxembourg, Finland, Sweden, Iceland, Switzerland, Greece, Croatia, Cyprus, Estonia, Latvia, Lithuania, Poland, Romania, Serbia, Slovenia and Slovakia.

On average in Europe, at the start of foreign language teaching, pupils have lessons for three to four hours a week. Compulsory lessons in a foreign language normally start at the end of primary school or the start of secondary school. In Luxembourg, Norway, Italy, Malta and Spain, however, the first foreign language starts at age six, in Denmark at age seven and in Belgium at age 10. About half of the EU's primary school pupils learn a foreign language.

English is the language taught most often at the lower secondary level in the EU. There, 93% of children learn English. At upper secondary level, English is even more widely taught. French is taught at lower secondary level in all EU countries except Slovenia. A total of 33% of European Union pupils learn French at this level. At upper secondary level the figure drops slightly to 28%. German is taught in nearly all EU countries. A total of 13% of pupils in the European Union learn German in lower secondary education, and 20% learn it at an upper secondary level.

Despite the high rate of foreign language teaching in schools, the number of adults claiming to speak a foreign language is generally lower than might be expected. This is particularly true of native English speakers: in 2004 a British survey showed that only one in 10 UK workers could speak a foreign language. Less than 5% could count to 20 in a second language, for example. 80% said they could work abroad anyway, because "everyone speaks English." In 2001, a European Commission survey found that 65.9% of people in the UK spoke only their native tongue.

Since the 1990s, the Common European Framework of Reference for Languages has tried to standardize the learning of languages across Europe (one of the first results being UNIcert).

Bilingual education

In some countries, learners have lessons taken entirely in a foreign language: for example, more than half of European countries with a minority or regional language community use partial immersion to teach both the minority and the state language.

In the 1960s and 1970s, some central and eastern European countries created a system of bilingual schools for well-performing pupils. Subjects other than languages were taught in a foreign language. In the 1990s this system was opened to all pupils in general education, although some countries still make candidates sit an entrance exam. At the same time, Belgium, France, the Netherlands, Austria and Finland also started bilingual schooling schemes. Germany meanwhile had established some bilingual schools in the late 1960s.

United Kingdom
French, German, and Spanish are taught in most schools, but the UK Government does not mandate the teaching of particular languages.

In England, all local authority-run schools must teach at least one foreign language to pupils between the ages of 7 and 14. At Key Stage 2 (ages 7 to 11), such schools must teach a modern or ancient language, while at Key Stage 3 (ages 11 to 14) they must teach a modern language. However, academies and free schools are exempt from this requirement. Furthermore, languages have not been compulsory beyond the age of 14 since 2004. 

In Scotland, the Scottish Government is implementing a "1+2" policy, giving pupils an "entitlement to learn a language" from the age of 4 or 5 until the age of 14 or 15. As of 2021, the policy intends for all schools to offer one additional language from Primary 1 (ages 4-6) and a second additional language from Primary 5 (ages 8-10). Both are expected to be taught until the end of Secondary 3 (ages 13-15). The government will not mandate specific languages, but rather these will be decided by schools and local authorities.

Language-learning uptake has been declining among UK students for decades, with French and German falling the most in the period 2013-2019. In 2020 it was reported that 30% of secondary schools in Scotland were failing to offer even one additional language, even though they are required by government to offer two.

United States

In most school systems, foreign language is taken in high school, with many schools requiring one to three years of foreign language in order to graduate. In some school systems, foreign language is also taught during middle school, and more recently, many elementary schools have been teaching foreign languages as well. However, foreign language immersion programs are growing in popularity, making it possible for elementary school children to begin serious development of a second language.

In 2008 the Center for Applied Linguistics conducted an extensive survey documenting foreign language study in the United States. The most popular language is Spanish, due to the large number of recent Spanish-speaking immigrants to the United States (see Spanish in the United States). According to this survey, in 2008 88% of language programs in elementary schools taught Spanish, compared to 93% in secondary schools. Other languages taught in U.S. high schools in 2008, in descending order of frequency, were French, German, Latin, Mandarin Chinese, American Sign Language, Italian, and Japanese. During the Cold War, the United States government pushed for Russian education, and some schools still maintain their Russian programs. Other languages recently gaining popularity include Arabic. The Center for Applied Linguistics also conducted a study that concluded that while the number of schools from the elementary to secondary level offering foreign language instruction are on the rise, a pitfall of the curriculum is that students are not becoming proficient in the target languages. Researchers also note that American students of foreign languages significantly underperform in comparison to their European and Asian counterparts.  It has been suggested that a system where foreign language instruction is required from PK-12 should be implemented in order to fix this problem.

Australia
Prior to the British colonisation, there were hundreds of Aboriginal languages, taught in a traditional way. The arrival of a substantial number of Irish in the first English convict ships meant that European Australia was not ever truly monolingual. When the gold rushes of the 1850s trebled the white population, it brought many more Welsh speakers, who had their own language newspapers through to the 1870s, but the absence of language education meant that these Celtic languages never flourished.

Waves of European migration after World War II brought "community languages," sometimes with schools. However, from 1788 until modern times it was generally expected that immigrants would learn English and abandon their first language. The wave of multicultural policies since the 1970s has softened aspects of these attitudes.

In 1982 a bipartisan committee of Australian parliamentarians was appointed and identified a number of guiding principles that would support a National Policy on Languages (NPL). Its trend was towards bilingualism in all Australians, for reasons of fairness, diversity and economics.

In the 1990s the Australian Languages and Literacy Policy (ALLP) was introduced, building on the NPL, with extra attention being given to the economic motivations of second language learning. A distinction became drawn between priority languages and community languages. The ten priority languages identified were Mandarin, French, German, Modern Greek, Indonesian, Japanese, Italian, Korean, Spanish and Aboriginal languages.

However, Australia's federal system meant that the NPL and ALLP direction was really an overall policy from above without much engagement from the states and territories. The NALSAS strategy united Australian Government policy with that of the states and territories. It focused on four targeted languages: Mandarin, Indonesian, Japanese and Korean. This would be integrated into studies of Society and Environment, English and Arts.

By 2000, the top ten languages enrolled in the final high school year were, in descending order: Japanese, French, German, Chinese, Indonesian, Italian, Greek, Vietnamese, Spanish and Arabic. In 2002, only about 10% of Year 12 included at least one language other than English (LOTE) among their course choices.
In 2009, Lo Bianco and Slaughter, recommended a new approach, stating that “What is needed is a universal apprenticeship in learning how to learn languages”. An apprenticeship language is a relatively easy language which is taught to overcome the limitations of monolingualism, in preparation for later mastery of a different language or languages. 

Reasons to use an apprenticeship language are:

 To make a start when target language teachers are unavailable.
 To master a whole foreign language, for motivation and effective subsequent learning.
 To combat procrastination in the face of diverse priorities in Language education.
 To normalize bilingualism and promote flexibility.
 To model creative problem solving, ethical behaviour and global citizenship.

A resource and method has been devised to implement the ALL approach by equipping generalist primary (elementary) teachers to teach the simple designed language Esperanto as a first, fluent, intercultural, foreign language.

The professional body for teachers of foreign languages in Australia is the Australian Federation of Modern Language Teachers Associations.

Japan

Hong Kong
Native Cantonese-speaking Hong Kong children commence learning English and maybe also Mandarin from age 3 when they go to kindergarten and continue until they finish their secondary education. The Hong Kong government's language policy is to produce people who are biliterate in English and Written Chinese and trilingual in Cantonese, Mandarin and English. In order to enter university in Hong Kong, students must pass both English and Chinese exams, or in the case of those who did not learn Chinese at school, due to having studied at an international school, another foreign language.

India
The syllabus taught in schools highly depends on the state.
Most of the states follow a 3 language policy in high schools. Three languages usually include the local language of the state and English as a first and third language and Hindi, Urdu and  Sanskrit as a second language (or recently some other foreign languages like French, German, Italian and in some schools, Arabic). Hindi-speaking states have recently started offering other regional languages in India as a second language.
Primary and middle schools mostly only teach two languages, the local language of state and English.
In medium and large cities, most private schools use English as the medium of instruction.

References

 Region
Language education by country
+Language